Szandra Szögedi (born 19 October 1988) is a Hungarian-born naturalized Ghanaian judoka who currently competes in the -63 kg event. Born and raised in Hungary, she is married to Ghanaian judoka Alex Amoako and competes for Ghana in international competitions. She competed in the Women's -63 kg at the 2014 Commonwealth Games.

Szögedi represented Ghana in the Women's -63 kg at the 2016 Summer Olympics in Rio de Janeiro, Brazil. She was the first female judoka to represent Ghana at an Olympic competition.

Competition record

References

External links 
 

1988 births
Living people
Martial artists from Budapest
Hungarian female judoka
Ghanaian female judoka
Hungarian emigrants to Ghana
Ghanaian people of Hungarian descent
Naturalized citizens of Ghana
Olympic judoka of Ghana
Commonwealth Games competitors for Ghana
Judoka at the 2014 Commonwealth Games
Judoka at the 2016 Summer Olympics
African Games bronze medalists for Ghana
African Games medalists in judo
Competitors at the 2015 African Games